Castella is a type of Japanese sponge cake.

Castella or de Castella may also refer to:


People
 Hubert de Castella (1825–1907), Swiss-Australian writer, artist and winemaker
 Jean-Edouard de Castella (1881–1966), Swiss painter and illustrator 
 Lilly de Castella, winemaker
 Paul de Castella (1827–1903), Swiss-Australian grazier and winemaker
 Robert de Castella (born 1957), Australian former world champion marathon runner
 Russ Castella (born 1983), American record producer
 Svend Aage Castella (1890–1938), Danish amateur soccer player
 Castella (Martinho Joaquim Castella Quessongo), Angolan footballer

Places
 Castella, California
 Castella, Lot-et-Garonne, France
 Castella, Victoria, Australia
 Castellau, Wales, has the alternative name of Castella

Other
 Castella (grape), another name for the Italian wine grape Bombino bianco
 Castella, ancient Roman fortlets
 Conservatorio de Castella, arts institute in Costa Rica

See also
 Castell (disambiguation)
 Castelli (disambiguation)
 Castello (disambiguation)
 Castells (disambiguation)
 Castile (disambiguation); Castella is the Catalan-language name of this region